Hvarf/Heim is a compilation album by Sigur Rós. Its original CD release comprises two discs: Hvarf contains studio versions of previously unreleased songs (with the exception of "Hafsól", which was released as the B-side of "Hoppípolla" in 2005), while Heim contains live acoustic versions of songs already released. The songs on Heim are the same recordings found in the documentary Heima. In 2008 EMI released a single-disc version in which Heim is simply tracklisted to follow Hvarf. In 2012, the albums were issued on vinyl for the first time to be sold on Record Store Day.

In December 2007, American webzine Somewhere Cold voted Hvarf/Heim EP of the Year on their 2007 Somewhere Cold Awards Hall of Fame.

Background
The cover images are pinhole polaroid photographs. The Hvarf cover is a handheld image of the microphone stands just before the band arrived to play in the gentle rain. The Heim cover is a 7-minute exposure of the stage at Gamla Borg where Sigur Rós performed an acoustic set for friends and family in April 2007.

The album was released on November 5 in Europe and on November 6 in North America. Prior to this release a limited 7" vinyl single of "Hljómalind" was released on 29 October. The album debuted at #23 in UK, #7 on the US independent chart and #83 in Spain selling over 50,000 copies in its first week worldwide. The album, was certified Silver in the UK for 60,000+ being sold. , sales in the United States have exceeded 91,000 copies, according to Nielsen SoundScan.

Track listing

Personnel
 Jón Þór Birgisson – vocals, guitar
 Kjartan Sveinsson – keyboard
 Georg Hólm – bass guitar
 Orri Páll Dýrason – drums

Charts

References

External links
covers and news on Sigur-ros.co.uk

Sigur Rós albums
2007 compilation albums
EMI Records compilation albums
XL Recordings compilation albums